Saleem Abdul Rasheed (born June 15, 1981) is a former American and Canadian football linebacker.

Rasheed played high school football at Shades Valley High School in Birmingham, Alabama. As a senior, he was named the state's Gatorade Player of the Year.

Rasheed played college football for the University of Alabama between 1999–2001. He was selected to the 2001 All-SEC football team.

Rasheed was selected by the San Francisco 49ers in the third round of the 2002 NFL Draft. As a rookie in 2002, he missed substantial playing time due to a nagging quadriceps injury.

He also played for the Houston Texans though he was cut during the 2006 preseason.

The Calgary Stampeders signed him on May 7, 2008.  He helped the Stampeders win the 2008 Grey Cup.

On May 4, 2009, he was released.

From 2009–11 he worked as a teacher and coach at Erwin High School.

In February 2012, Rasheed was charged with food stamp fraud and falsifying documents in Birmingham, Alabama. He pleaded guilty to receiving $5,551 dollars in food stamps while falsely claiming to be unemployed and, in July 2012, he was sentenced to eight months in prison. Rasheed also pleaded guilty to immigration fraud arising from his allegedly marrying a Moroccan woman and subsequently marrying an American woman without divorcing his first wife. In April 2013, Rasheed was sentenced to three years in prison for having sex with two students while a teacher at Woodlawn High School in Birmingham. Although the students were at or above the age of consent in Alabama, it is illegal for a teacher to have sex with students in the state.

References

External links 
 Saleem Rasheed at stampeders.com
 Saleem Rasheed at NFL.com
 Saleem Rasheed at scout.com

1981 births
Living people
Players of American football from Birmingham, Alabama
American football linebackers
Canadian football linebackers
Players of Canadian football from Birmingham, Alabama
Alabama Crimson Tide football players
San Francisco 49ers players
Calgary Stampeders players
African-American schoolteachers
People convicted of sex crimes
American people convicted of fraud
People convicted of immigration fraud
Prisoners and detainees of Alabama
Prisoners and detainees of the United States federal government
21st-century African-American people
20th-century African-American people